Upperlands is a small village in County Londonderry, Northern Ireland. It is situated 3 miles north east of Maghera. It lies within the civil parish of Maghera, the historic barony of Loughinsholin, and is situated within Mid-Ulster District. In the 2011 Census it had a population of 561 people.

Name
Upperlands takes its name from the townland of Upperland (a townland of 568 acres) in which part of it lies (the rest lies in the townland of Tirgarvil (a townland of 435 acres). The townland of Upperland gets its name from the garbled pronunciation of the Irish Áth an Phoirt Leathain. This has historically been anglicised as Aghfortlany, Aportlaughan, Apportlane, Amfordlan, Ampurtain and Ampertaine. The latter is the name of the local primary school.

History
Upperlands owes its existence to the linen industry and the Clark family who established the first linen mill there in 1736. Subsequent development of the industry led to the construction of substantial residences and small groups of workers homes, and shaped the form and character of Upperlands. Boyne Row (a group of listed buildings), in its riverside setting, represents workers housing, built by the mill-owners. There are four-man-made lakes or "dams" in Upperlands. These used to serve the linen mills. They are Craig's dam, Island dam, Green dam and Lapping-room dam. There is a scenic walk around the dams and they are kept stocked with fish for the benefit of anglers.

Ampertain (or Ampertaine) House is a plain late-Georgian type two-storey house built by Alexander Clark (1785–1871) in Upperlands around 1835. The front was elongated by a two-storey wing of similar style added in 1915. It also features a Victorian conservatory. It is a Grade B1 listed building which adjoins the main mill building complex of Clark's Mill.

Rivers
The Knockoneil River leased by the Clady And District Angling Club flows through the woodland and Clarks Dams and then onwards through the town. Water is drawn from the river south of Amportane Bridge into 4 manmade mill lakes known as clarkes or upperlands dams and flows out through a 6-foot brick pipe tunnel back into the river. The river in the town itself is easy access for anglers just below the town bridge Upperlands Bridge and fishable mainly upstream through Clarks Dams and on up to Amportane Bridge beside Lagans Scutch Mill and onwards upstream to Swatragh. Access downstream is more difficult as the river flows through mainly private properties. Anglers can access the river at the Boyne bridge on the southeast end of the town there is also an abandoned single-span railway bridge hidden .This river merges with the Grillagh River to form the Clady River

The Grillagh River located a mile outside the town flowing under the Beresford Bridge on the Culnady Road Starting up in Carntogher Mountain and merging with the Knockoneil River to form the Clady River.This river is also leased by the Clady And District Angling Club.

There is also the Upperlands Dams which are manmade loughs built over the centuries. Water from the Knockoneil is diverted through various sluice gates biggest ones being located downstream from Amportane Bridge on the Hillside Road and once a millrace which flowed from Barney Lagans Flax Scutch Mill over the river via an aqueduct into the dams. The Lakes are known as Craigs Dam, Green Dam, Lapping Dam, Island Dam. in the 1998 water was diverted from the Lapping Room Lake into a turbine for electricity which flows back into the source being the Knockoneil River. The Dams are lively with stocked and wild Brown Trout and Eels. They were built for William Clark And Sons originally but now are mainly used as a nature reserve and a fishery.

Amenities

The village has a small shop called Junes Superstore, and a Royal British Legion and also a community centre.

Upperlands also has a Hibernian Hall which was built in 1907 and also a Protestant Hall which was used by the local Orange Lodge which was called Upperlands Purple Marksmen LOL 817. It was founded around 1900 by Nathaniel McCoord, and had many notable members throughout its history including Henry Clark who was the MP for North Antrim (he would later resign after marrying a Roman Catholic), Alfred E. Lee who became a Deputy Grand Master (who would in the 1960s transfer from this lodge) among others.

Upperlands lodge had been in a steady decline since the early 1980s and became notable for the high number of resignations and transfer requests (men asking to join another lodge) and had at one point, according to official reports, more transfers and resignations that ever other lodge in their district combined.  However, there is still a strong Orange presence in the village with a large number of local men belonging to Culnady, Maghera and Timaconavey Orange Lodges.

The Apprentice Boys of Derry, Upperlands branch, Murray club used to be one of the largest clubs on parade at the Londonderry celebrations but now has a steady membership of around 30 or so men. They also use the Protestant hall for meetings as do the local Royal Black Preceptory which has ceased to exist since 2006, with Culnady Knights of King Solomon Royal Black Preceptory 1002 now being seen as the local encampment.

Upperlands had a Lambeg drumming club at the start of the 20th century and a renowned pipe band in the 1930s but this was later replaced with a number of flute bands which have since died out.

Education 
Primary education is provided by Ampertaine Primary School that educates around 120 pupils.  A 'Short Inspection' by the Education and Training Inspectorate in September 2009 described the overall quality of the teaching as "good or very good" and arrangements for pastoral care in the school as "very good". In February 2014 the school adopted Aston Villa F.C., who play in the school colours of claret and blue, as the focus of an educational initiative. The school was recognised as the Top Performing Northern Ireland primary school for use of the international Accelerated Reader resource at a Renaissance Learning Awards ceremony in London, October 2016.

Sport
Upperlands Football Club was founded in 1910 they played under several different names until the 1950s. These were the golden years for the club. They play in the Premier Division of the Coleraine & District League briefly stop playing in 2015 before returning rejuvenated in 2019. The young Aces are back in the Coleraine & District League in 2019 to the delight of the local community. Their home ground is Festival Park, and the club most recently won the Constitution Cup 2009/10. The senior team partake in the Coleraine and District League which is affiliated to the Irish Football Association. They hope to start the Swifts team and Old Mill Youth Academy in the near future. Watch this space.

People
 Wendy Houvenaghel (b. 27 November 1974) is a cyclist from Upperlands, riding on both the road and track, but specialising in the latter. She has represented the United Kingdom in various world events, most notably winning an Olympic silver medal in the 3000m pursuit in Beijing and a gold medal in the team pursuit at the 2008 and 2009 Track World Championships. She has also won various British national competitions and represented England at the 2006 Commonwealth Games. Wendy is set to participate in her second Olympic Games representing Great Britain at London 2012.
 Dean Shiels (born 1 February 1985) is a professional soccer player who last played for Coleraine F.C. He was previously contracted to Scottish Premier League teams Kilmarnock F.C., Hibernian and Rangers F.C. Shiels was with Arsenal as a youngster, but made no first team appearances for the club. He was born and grew up in Upperlands. Dean is also a regular member of the Northern Ireland national football team squad. He has achieved a successful football career despite the disability of losing an eye in a childhood accident.

Transport
Upperlands railway station opened on 18 December 1880, closed for passenger traffic on 28 August 1950 and finally closed on 1 October 1959.

2001 Census 
Upperlands is classified as a small village or hamlet by the Northern Ireland Statistics and Research Agency (NISRA) (i.e. with population between 500 and 1,000 people).
On Census day (29 April 2011) there were 561 people living in Upperlands. Of these:
 21.5% were aged under 16 years and 21.2% were aged 60 and over
 51.2% of the population were male and 48.8% were female
 4.9% were from a Catholic background and 94.4% were from a Protestant background
 4.2% of people aged 16–74 were unemployed

For more details see: NI Neighbourhood Information Service

2011 Census 
It had a population of 561 people
 9.5% were from a Catholic background and 85.4% were from a Protestant background

See also 
 List of towns and villages in Northern Ireland

References 

 Draft Magherafelt Area Plan 2015
 NI population of settlements estimates from 2011 census

External links 
 Upperlands Linen Village

Villages in County Londonderry
Civil parish of Maghera
Mid-Ulster District
Model villages
Linen industry in Ireland